John Edward W. Hall (born 6 May 1885) was an English football player, who later became a manager in the Netherlands.

Playing career 
Born in Tyne Dock, South Shields, he started his playing career with local sides Harton Star and Kingston Villa, before joining Barnsley in 1905. After three seasons with Barnsley, he moved to the Southern League with Brighton & Hove Albion. After spells with Rochdale and his home town club, South Shields, he returned to the Football League with Preston North End in 1910. He then played for Doncaster Rovers and Pontypridd, before returning to South Shields.

Coaching career
He  coached Dutch club side PSV between 1929 and 1935. He also coached Feyenoord between 1926 and 1929, and again between 1939 and 1940, as well as VUC in 1937.

References

1885 births
Footballers from South Shields
Year of death missing
English footballers
Association football wingers
Barnsley F.C. players
Brighton & Hove Albion F.C. players
Rochdale A.F.C. players
South Shields F.C. (1889) players
Preston North End F.C. players
Doncaster Rovers F.C. players
Pontypridd F.C. players
English football managers
PSV Eindhoven managers
Willem II (football club) managers
Feyenoord managers
Southern Football League players
English Football League players
English expatriate football managers
Midland Football League players